"Colourblind" is the debut single of Scottish singer-songwriter Darius Campbell, who finished third on the first series of Pop Idol in 2002. It is the first song taken from his debut solo album, Dive In (2002).

Release
It was released on 29 July 2002 and reached number one in the UK Singles Chart for two weeks. It also peaked at number 13 on the Irish Singles Chart. Following Campbell's death on 11 August 2022, the song debuted at number two on both the UK Official Single Download and Official Single Sales Charts on 19 August 2022.

Song history
After turning down an offer of a multimillion-dollar record deal by Pop Idol judge Simon Cowell to sign with his record label, Darius began work on his solo album on which "Colourblind" would be included.

Darius had been working on the song pre-Pop Idol and was originally ignored by Cowell, however after meeting with Pete Glenister and Deni Lew as well as Steve Lillywhite, the song began to be considered as a possible single.

Music video
The video for the single was shot over four days in Sierra Nevada, Spain. It follows Darius as he is thrown out of a car in the middle of the countryside. He changes his outfit from a black suit to jeans, to signify he is leaving his Pop Idol image behind.

He meets a girl whose car has stalled, played by model Jacqui Ainsley. After the two meet, a romance ensues, whilst also cutting away to a close up of Darius singing the track as well as playing his guitar. Ainsley later became Darius' girlfriend in real-life, although the couple broke up in 2004.

Track listings

UK CD1
 "Colourblind"
 "It's Not Unusual" (live)
 "Colourblind" (acoustic)
 "Colourblind" (video)

UK CD2
 "Colourblind"
 "Chrysalis to Butterfly"
 Video interview

UK cassette single
 "Colourblind"
 "It's Not Unusual" (live)
 "Chrysalis to Butterfly"

European and Australasian CD single
 "Colourblind"
 "Chrysalis to Butterfly"
 "Colourblind" (Almighty mix)
 "Colourblind" (8 Jam remix)
 "Colourblind" (video)

Charts

Weekly charts

Year-end charts

Certifications

Release history

References

2002 songs
2002 debut singles
Darius Campbell songs
Mercury Records singles
Number-one singles in Scotland
Songs written by Darius Campbell
Songs written by Deni Lew
Songs written by Pete Glenister
UK Singles Chart number-one singles